Galati is a surname. Notable people with the surname include:
	
Frank Galati (1943–2023), American actor
Giovanni Galati (1897–1971), Italian admiral
Martinho Lutero Galati (1953–2020), Brazilian conductor
Rocco Galati (born 1959), Italian-born Canadian lawyer
Tom Galati (born 1951), American soccer player

See also 
Galati (disambiguation)
Ilarion Ionescu-Galați (born 1937), Romanian violinist
Galați (disambiguation)